Benjamin Gumbs II (died 1768) was a British colonial governor and sugarcane plantation owner on Katouche Bay. He was Deputy Governor of Anguilla from 1750 until 1768.

References

Deputy Governors of Anguilla
1768 deaths
Planters from the British West Indies
Year of birth unknown